During the COVID-19 pandemic, the following hospital fires occurred in Romanian healthcare facilities:

References 

Hospital fires in Romania
COVID-19 pandemic in Romania
Lists of events in Romania
Lists of fires